An SPAA is a self-propelled anti-aircraft weapon.

SPAA may also refer to:
Rutgers School of Public Affairs and Administration, at Rutgers University, Newark, New Jersey
 Screen Producers Australia, formerly Screen Producers Association of Australia, a professional association
Symposium on Parallelism in Algorithms and Architectures, an academic conference in the fields of parallel computing and distributed computing
Subpixel anti-aliasing, a way to increase the apparent resolution of a computer's screen